Juan Sebastián Cabal and Robert Farah defeated Nicolas Mahut and Édouard Roger-Vasselin in the final, 6–7(5–7), 7–6(7–5), 7–6(8–6), 6–7(5–7), 6–3 to win the men's doubles tennis title at the 2019 Wimbledon Championships. Cabal and Farah saved five match points en route to the title, against Jean-Julien Rojer and Horia Tecău in the quarterfinals. With the win, they jointly attained the ATP number one doubles ranking; Mike Bryan, Łukasz Kubot and Bruno Soares were also in contention for the top ranking.

Mike Bryan and Jack Sock were the reigning champions, but Sock did not participate due to injury. Mike Bryan partnered his brother Bob, but lost in the third round to Mahut and Roger-Vasselin.

This was the first Wimbledon where a final set tie break rule was introduced. Upon reaching 12–12 in the fifth set, a classic tie break would be played. Henri Kontinen and John Peers won the first final set tie break played in any match in Wimbledon history, defeating Rajeev Ram and Joe Salisbury in the third round.

This was the sixth consecutive major where the men's doubles event was won by a pair of players from the same nation.

Seeds

Draw

Finals

Top half

Section 1

Section 2

Bottom half

Section 3

Section 4

References

External links
 Gentlemen's Doubles draw
2019 Wimbledon Championships – Men's draws and results at the International Tennis Federation

Men's Doubles
Wimbledon Championship by year – Men's doubles